Heaven & Hell is the debut solo-album by New Zealand/Hip-Hop artist Devolo. The album's first single "Somebody" became a top 10 hit on the NZ iTunes top songs for all genres and #1 on NZ iTunes top hip hop downloads. The second single "Too Shy" jumped from #38 to #6 in one week on New Zealand’s RIANZ Top 40 Singles Chart. The album's third single was released one year after the original released of the album, it reached #6 on the IMNZ Top 10 Airplay.

Track listing
"King David"
"Somebody"
"Too Shy"
"Can't Let You Go" (Ft. Lemuel)
"Good Day"
"Take It Back"
"Let Me In" (Ft. TJ)
"Heaven & Hell"
"Bring It"
"God Chose Me" (Ft. Savage)
"Fresh Til My Death" (Ft. Mareko)
"I Wanna Know" (Ft. TJ)
"Think About You"
"Thank you"

References 

 

2009 albums
Devolo (singer) albums